Johnston Busingye is a Rwandan lawyer, who is the current High Commissioner of Rwanda to the United Kingdom. Previously, he served as the Minister of Justice and Attorney General, from 2013-2022.

Background and education
He has a Bachelor of Laws, obtained from Makerere University. He also holds a Diploma in Legal Practice, awarded by the Law Development Centre in Kampala.

Career
Johnston Busingye has held many positions in the Rwandan government and Rwandan judiciary. from 2006 until 2013, he served as the President of the High Court of Rwanda. Other responsibilities in the past, include as the National Prosecutor of Rwanda, as Permanent Secretary in the Ministry of Justice(Minijust), and as Principal Judge of the East African Court of Justice (EACJ). In his capacity as Minister of Justice, he announced in July 2014, the decision by the government of Rwanda, not to become a member of the International Criminal Court (ICC).

See also
Cabinet of Rwanda

References

External links
Website of the Rwanda Ministry of Justice

Living people
Year of birth missing (living people)
Rwandan judges
21st-century Rwandan politicians
Justice ministers of Rwanda
Makerere University alumni
Law Development Centre alumni
Harvard Kennedy School alumni